Lawrence Edward Sullivan, Jr. (born September 10, 1970) is an American actor. Among his prominent roles is that of Robert, Will's ballet dancing boyfriend, on the NBC television series Will & Grace. The episode was the show's first ever holiday episode, titled "Jingle Balls." Sullivan frequently appears as Officer Andy Akers on the CBS television series CSI: Crime Scene Investigation. Sullivan appeared in 3 episodes of 24 as Secret Service Agent Hoskins. His latest work includes a guest appearance on Modern Family as Mitchell's ex-boyfriend in the episode "My Hero" and a recurring role in the first season of the HBO series Big Little Lies.

Life and career
Sullivan was born in New Haven, Connecticut on September 10, 1970, to Lawrence and Sheryl Sullivan.

Sullivan was a member of the First National Tour of the Broadway Musical Miss Saigon, and starred in the West Coast Premiere of Hello Again by Michael John LaChiusa at Noah Wyle's The Blank Theatre Company in Hollywood, California. Sullivan played the leading role of Alan Oakley in The Trip, for which role he won Best Actor at the Dallas OUT TAKES Film Festival.

Sullivan's husband is actor David Monahan; they have one adopted child together. The family was featured in a Campbell's Soup commercial in 2015.

Filmography

Television

Other work
2002: American Idol (Video Game) (voice)
2011: L.A. Noire (Video Game) as A. D. A. Leonard Petersen (voice)

References

External links
 

1970 births
Living people
American male film actors
American male television actors
Male actors from New Haven, Connecticut
American gay actors
LGBT people from Connecticut
21st-century American male actors
20th-century American male actors